Gilbert Field  is a public use airport located one nautical mile (2 km) west of the central business district of Rio, a village in Columbia County, Wisconsin, United States. It is privately owned by Rio Aero Club, Inc.

Facilities and aircraft 
It has one runway designated 9/27 with a 1,092 x 65 ft. (333 x 20 m) turf surface. 

For the 12-month period ending June 17, 2020, the airport had 5,805 aircraft operations, an average of 15 per day: 99% general aviation and less than 1% military. In January 2023, there were 10 aircraft based at this airport: 8 single-engine and 2 ultralight.

See also 
 List of airports in Wisconsin

References

External links 
  at Wisconsin DOT Airport Directory

Airports in Wisconsin
Buildings and structures in Columbia County, Wisconsin